Bulk foods are food items offered in large quantities, which can be purchased in large, bulk lots or transferred from a bulk container into a smaller container for purchase. Bulk foods may be priced less compared to packaged foods because they are typically packaged in large generic bulk containers and packaging for grocery outlets, which utilizes lesser natural resources. Additionally, less packaging is congruent with the environmental conservation of natural resources and sustainability. One study found a 96% reduction in packaging used for bulk foods compared to packaged foods.

National Bulk Foods Week
A National Bulk Foods Week was designated between October 16–22, 2011 in ten U.S. states.

Products

Some commonly available bulk foods and products include:

Dry goods

 Beans
 Candy
 Licorice
 Cereals 
 Coffee
 Cookies
 Cornmeal
 Dehydrated potatoes
 Dried fruits
 Dates
 Dried kiwifruit
 Grains
 Bulgur
 Flour
 Oats
 Pancake mix
 Pasta
 Dry Noodles 
 Popcorn
 Rice
 Whole grains
 Granola
 Herbs 
 Nuts
 Peanuts 
 Pet food
 Pretzels 
 Salt
 Seasonings 
 Spices 
 Crystallized ginger
 Sugar
 Tea
 Trail mix

Liquid and wet goods

 Honey
 Cooking oils
 Fruit spreads
 Olive oil
 Maple syrup
 Molasses
 Peanut butter
 Vinegar

Household goods
 Dish detergent
 Laundry detergent

Retailers
Notable retailers of bulk foods include:

 Cub Foods
 Colruyt
 Costco
 Food 4 Less
 Bulk Barn
 Giant Eagle
 Lunds
 Real Canadian Superstore
 Roundy's
 Rungis International Market
 Sam's Club
 Sprouts Farmers Market
 Whole Foods Market
 WinCo Foods

See also

 Grocers originally sold dry goods out of bins and barrels
 Grocery store

References

Further reading
 
 

Food retailing